Marius Colau (31 January 1922 – 1 January 2006) was a French footballer. He competed in the men's tournament at the 1948 Summer Olympics.

References

External links

1922 births
2006 deaths
French footballers
Olympic footballers of France
Footballers at the 1948 Summer Olympics
Place of birth missing
Association football midfielders
Stade Rennais F.C. players